The Mausoleum of Three Leaders located at Shahbag, Dhaka in Bangladesh, contains the graves of three prominent leaders of Pakistan Movement from Bengal:  A. K. Fazlul Huq, Huseyn Shaheed Suhrawardy and Khwaja Nazimuddin. All three men served as the Prime Minister of Bengal in British India and after independence two of them also served as Prime Minister of Pakistan.

The monument was designed by architect S. A. K. Masud Ahmad (former Chief Architect, Govt. of Bangladesh) and was established in 1963 during East Pakistan. The style of architecture of the monuments is an interpretation of Islamic Arcs.

Location
The Mausoleum of three leaders is located in Suhrawardy Udyan in Shahbagh across from the Doel Square near the University of Dhaka.

Background
The Mausoleum of three leaders was established in the year 1963. It was designed by architect S.A.K. Masud Ahmad. The three political leaders are A.K. Fazlul Huq, Huseyn Shaheed Suhrawardy and Khawaja Nazimuddin. The three leaders died on different dates but were all buried in the same area as all three of them had contributed significantly to East Pakistan and were all involved politically.

A.K. Fazlul Huq was a very well known politician who was famous for his leadership qualities. One of his most important contributions was being involved with the Bengali Language Movement. He also presented the Lahor Prostab (Lahore Resolution) in 1940. Fazlul Huq along with Huseyn Suhrawardy had engaged in many political acts such as forming the United Front in the 1954 elections, with which they had gained victory by winning the most seats. Huseyn Suhrawardy and Fazlul Huq had also worked together to control the government of East Pakistan. However, it was rumored that Suhrawardy and Fazlul Huq had rivalry between them which had caused Fazul Huq to step down from politics.
Suhrawardy was known to be the founder of the Bangladesh Awami League. He was also known to contribute significantly to the growth and development of East Pakistan. Suhrawardy became the Prime Minister of Pakistan in 1956 but resigned in 1957.

Sir Khawaja Nazimuddin served as the second Governor-General of Pakistan from 1948 to 1951 and also served as the second Prime Minister of Pakistan from 1951 to 1953. Suhrawardy had served as the Minister of Labor and also the Minister of Civil Supplies under Khawaja Nazimuddin.

Even with all these achievements, it was rumored that these three political leaders had a rivalry with each other in terms of success. However, despite their rivalry, three of the political leaders were buried under the same roof of the mausoleum of the three leaders.

Architecture

The style of architecture of the monuments is an interpretation of Islamic Arcs. The Mausoleum of three leaders consists of a hyperbolic paraboloid structure that is erected over the three graves of the three political leaders. It is possible to enter this mausoleum from two sides. Although you have to go underground to see the three tombs located here, there are replicas of three graves below the monument.

References

External links

 Official website

Three Leaders
Buildings and structures completed in 1963
1963 establishments in East Pakistan